Rosegold is the fifth solo studio album by American country music singer-songwriter Ashley Monroe, released April 30, 2021, via Mountainrose Sparrow and Thirty Tigers. It follows her 2018 solo release Sparrow, as well as her album Interstate Gospel as part of the country group Pistol Annies from the same year.

Reception

 AllMusic's Stephen Thomas Erlewine wrote, "Sometimes, Rosegold threatens to drift away yet it's never threadbare: It's a singular mood piece, one that suits a spell of twilight reflection." Pastes Ellen Johnson wrote, "It's easy to sink into these 10 songs". Pitchforks Stephen M. Deusner wrote that Monroe "flattens out the twang and borrows from pop and hip-hop, to mixed results", and that "once you get past the gutsiness of an artist willing to jettison her comfort zone, what you're left with is muddled and unsatisfying."

Under the Radars Mark Moody wrote that "If more focused, and either working exclusively with [producer Mike] Reaves or someone outside the Nashville inner circle, Rosegold could have had more of a chance to shine as a unified release. As it is, there are a handful of worthwhile singles worth mining, but unlike Monroe's work to date, as a whole the album doesn't coalesce as it could have." Slates Jim Malec wrote that the album "once again finds the singer-songwriter traversing new ground, but it's an even sharper departure from her previous work", and that "it's an ambitious exercise in style that's ultimately lacking in substance."

Track listing

Charts

References

2021 albums
Ashley Monroe albums
Thirty Tigers albums
Country albums by American artists
Pop albums by American artists
Hip hop albums by American artists